Alice M. Laskey ( - November 22, 1998) was a U.S. Naval Officer and biochemist and who worked in the National Institutes of Health division of research grants and the National Institute of Allergy and Infectious Diseases. She was a lieutenant commander during World War II.

Life 
Laskey was born in Duluth, Minnesota. She graduated from University of Minnesota. In the 1930s, Laskey was a medical technician and later biochemist at the Veterans Administration Hospital laboratories at Fort Snelling, Dwight, Illinois, and Long Island. She completed a master's degree in biochemistry at Georgetown University. Laskey was a lieutenant commander who served in WAVES and was stationed at the National Naval Medical Center. 

After World War II, Laskey joined the National Institutes of Health (NIH). She was a chemist at the National Institute of Allergy and Infectious Diseases (NIAID). In 1963, she left the NIH division of research grants (DRG) to return to NIAID and the United States National Library of Medicine. Laskey returned to DRG 's research documentation section in the statistics and analysis branch in 1965. She was a Fellow of the American Association for the Advancement of Science. She served as president of the D.C. chapter of the National Graduate Women of Science. In 1970, Laskey retired from her position as a supervisory scientific reference analyst after forty years of working for the U.S. Federal Government.

Laskey died November 22, 1998 at the age of 92 in Bethesda, Maryland due to diabetes-related complications.

References

Female United States Navy officers
WAVES personnel
American women biochemists
20th-century American women scientists
National Institutes of Health people
Fellows of the American Academy of Arts and Sciences
20th-century American biochemists
1906 births
1998 deaths
People from Duluth, Minnesota
Scientists from Minnesota
University of Minnesota alumni
Georgetown University alumni